NA-178 (Muzaffargarh-III) was a constituency for the National Assembly of Pakistan.

Area
The constituency consisted of following area
 (a)Muzaffargarh Municipal Committee 
 (b) Khangarh Town Committee. 
 (c) Muzaffargarh Qanungo Halqa excluding the following Patwar Circles:— 
 (i) Rakh Khan Pur 
 (ii) Khan Pur Shumali 
 (d) The following Patwar Circles of Muradabad Qanungo Habqa•— 
 (i) Ali Pur Janubi 
 (ii) Khangarh Janubi 
 (iii) Thatha Siyalan 
 (e) The following Qanungo Halqa of Muzaffargarh Tehsil 
 (i) Shah Jamal 
 (ii) Meharpur  
 (iii) Khanguh 
of Muzaffargarh District.

Election 2002 

General elections were held on 10 Oct 2002. Muhammad Shahid Jamil Qureshi of PML-Q won by 60,386 votes.

Election 2008 

General elections were held on 18 Feb 2008. Jamshed Ahmad Khan Dasti of PPP won by 57,946 votes.

Election 2013 

General elections were held on 11 May 2013. Jamshed Ahmad Khan Dasti an Independent candidate won by 79,417 votes and became the  member of National Assembly.

References

External links 
Election result's official website

NA-178

Constituencies of Muzaffargarh
Politics of Muzaffargarh
Constituencies of Pakistan